Kamel Daoud (born June 17, 1970) is a French-Algerian writer and journalist. He currently edits the French-language daily Le quotidien d’Oran, for which he writes a popular column, "Raïna Raïkoum" (Our Opinion, Your Opinion). The column often includes commentary on the news.

Early life and education
Daoud was born in Mostaganem, Algeria on June 17, 1970. The oldest of six children, he was raised in an Arabic-speaking Muslim family in Algeria. Daoud studied French literature at the University of Oran.
Daoud was married but divorced in 2008, after the birth of his daughter as his wife had become increasingly religious (and started wearing the hijab). He is a father to two children (the eldest, a son, the youngest, a daughter) and dedicated his novel The Meursault Investigation to them.

Journalistic career 
In 1994, he entered Le Quotidien d'Oran, a French-language Algerian newspaper. He published his first column three years later, titled "Raina raikoum" ("Our opinion, your opinion"). He was the Editor in Chief of the newspaper for eight years. He is a Columnist in various media, an editorialist in the online newspaper Algérie-Focus and his articles are also published in Slate Afrique.

Controversies

Recommendation of execution 
On 13 December 2014, on On n'est pas couché on France 2, Kamel Daoud said of his relationship to Islam:

Three days later, Abdelfattah Hamadache Zeraoui, a Salafist imam at the time working on Echourouk News, responded to this statement by declaring that Daoud should be put to death for saying it, writing that "if Islamic sharia were applied in Algeria, the penalty would be death for apostasy and heresy." He specified:

He then reiterated his threats on Ennahar TV, an extension of the Arabic daily Ennahar newspaper.

Daoud filed a complaint in Algerian court and the judiciary delivered a judgment on March 8, 2016 that Daoud's attorney called "unprecedented": Zeraoui was sentenced to three to six months in prison and a 50,000-dinar fine. However, this sentence was annulled in June 2016 by the Oran Court of Appeal for "territorial incompetence".

Work
Daoud's debut novel, The Meursault Investigation (in French, Meursault, contre-enquête) (2013), won the Prix Goncourt du Premier Roman (Goncourt Prize for a First Novel), as well as the prix François Mauriac and the Prix des cinq continents de la francophonie. It was also shortlisted for the Prix Renaudot.

In April 2015, an excerpt from Meursault, contre-enquête was featured in the New Yorker magazine. The November 20, 2015, issue of the New York Times featured an op-ed opinion piece by Daoud titled "Saudi Arabia, an ISIS That Has Made It" in both English (translated by John Cullen) and French.  
The February 14, 2016, issue of the New York Times featured a controversial second op-ed piece by Daoud, "The Sexual Misery of the Arab World" in English (translated by John Cullen), French, and Arabic. Both of these articles were republished in his 2017 collection of essays Mes Indépendances.

In 2018, his Le Quotidien d'Oran articles (2010-2016) were translated into English.

Bibliography

Novels
  
Originally published by Éditions Barzakh in 2013 then by Actes Sud in 2014.
Zabor, or The Psalms (2021). Translated by Ramadan, Emma. Other Press.
Zabor ou Les Psaumes (2017). Éditions Barzach and Actes Sud.

Short fiction 

 L'Arabe et le Vaste Pays de ô... (2008). Éditions Barzakh.
 La Préface du Négre (2008). Éditions Barzakh.
 Republished in France as Minotaure 504 (2011). Sabine Wespieser éditeur.

Non-fiction 

 Mes indépendences – Chroniques 2010-2016 (2017). Éditions Barzakh and Actes Sud.
 Le Peintre dévorant la femme (2018). Stock.
Stories

References

External links
  Daoud, Kamel. "Lettre à un ami étranger ." Le Quotidien d'Oran.

1970 births
Living people
Algerian journalists
Algerian writers in French
Algerian writers
Fatwas
The New Yorker people
People from Mostaganem
Prix Goncourt du Premier Roman recipients
University of Oran alumni
21st-century Algerian people